Acer Tempo is the first windows mobile smartphone series developed by the Acer Inc. This is the first line from the company introduced since it acquired phone manufacturer E-TEN. The handset was officially presented during the 2009 Mobile World Congress. The range includes four different models.

Aspire Tempo Smartphone series
Acer Tempo X960
Acer Tempo F900
Acer Tempo M900
Acer Tempo DX900

Acer Tempo X960 
Acer Tempo X960 is the first Tempo Smartphone released in May 2009.  It comes with 2.8in VGA touch screen, HSDPA 3G, Wi-Fi, 3.0Mp camera, A-GPS http.

Acer Tempo F900 
Acer Tempo F900 is a Windows Mobile Professional handset released September 2009. It comes with 3.8 inch touch screen Wi-Fi, HSDPA, GPS and WiFi connectivity.

Acer Tempo M900 
Acer Tempo M900 is the third handset of the quartet launched by the company. It comes with a QWERTY slideout keyboard and 3.8” WVGA touch screen 
and it comes equipped with GPS, Fingerprint scanner, FM Radio and a 5-megapixel autofocus camera with flash.

Acer Tempo DX900 
Acer Tempo DX900 is Acer's smartphone designed for a business use. It is the world’s first Dual-SIM Smartphone to support both 3.5G (HSDPA) and 2.75G (EDGE) SIM cards. It comes with 2.8in VGA touch screen, 3.0 megapixel autofocus camera, GPS, Wi-Fi and HSDPA 3G

References

External links
Acer Tempo Smartphone Series Official Website

Acer Inc. smartphones
Windows Mobile devices